Kirk Wallace Johnson is an American author, journalist, and founder of The List Project, a not-for-profit organization that helps resettle Iraqi refugees who previously worked for the U.S. government during the Iraq War. He served as the U.S. Agency for International Development regional coordinator for reconstruction in Fallujah, Iraq in 2005.

Early life and education
Johnson was born in West Chicago, Illinois. His father, Thomas L. Johnson, served several terms as a Republican State Representative and Senator, and his mother, Virginia L. Johnson, was a policy advisor to the Illinois Attorney General.  As a fifteen-year-old, Johnson visited Egypt with his grandmother, and began studying Arabic in evening classes at the College of DuPage, skipping his high school graduation to attend the Arabic Language Institute at the American University in Cairo.

He graduated from the University of Chicago in 2002, with a degree in Near Eastern Languages and Civilizations.  In addition to studying in Syria on a Foreign Language Acquisition Grant (2001), Johnson received a Fulbright Scholarship to conduct research on political Islamism in Egypt (2002–03).

The List Project
Johnson was opposed to the Iraq War, but felt an ethical obligation to help with the reconstruction efforts, which he supported as a way of righting a wrong.  After returning from Iraq with PTSD, he was contacted by his former Iraqi colleagues, who were running for their lives as a result of working for the U.S. Government during the war.  In December 2006, he wrote an op-ed for the "Los Angeles Times" calling upon the government to open its doors to these allies.  In response, he was flooded with petitions from thousands of refugees, leading him to found the List Project to Resettle Iraqi Allies, a non-profit that marshaled hundreds of attorneys from the nations top law firms to represent their cases on a pro bono basis.  Over the subsequent eight years, the List Project helped over 2,000 U.S.-affiliated Iraqis resettle to America.  Johnson testified before Congress and worked closely with Senator Ted Kennedy toward the creation of the Special Immigrant Visa program, designated for Iraqis and Afghans that worked for the United States during the wars.

His work was profiled in 60 Minutes, the Today Show, The New Yorker, and This American Life; it was the subject of his 2013 memoir To Be a Friend Is Fatal: the Fight to Save the Iraqis America Left Behind.

Writing 
After returning from Iraq, Johnson began fly-fishing, which led him to the story that would become his true crime book, The Feather Thief. The story is about how an American flutist, Edwin Rist stole remains of rare birds from the Natural History Museum in England. Hobbyists pay high prices for the feathers of exotic birds, including fly-fishers, who use them to catch fish. He learned of the heist when a guide from New Mexico told the story, leading to a five-year period of research and interviews, including with Rist. The book will be adapted into a television series by Jenna Bush Hager's production company. The film rights to The Fishermen and the Dragon has been sold to George Clooney's production company for a multi-part series.

Fellowships
 Senior Fellow at the USC Annenberg Center on Communication Leadership and Policy
 MacDowell Fellow, 2013
 Helene Wurlitzer Foundation, Fall 2011
 Bosch Public Policy Fellow, American Academy in Berlin, Fall 2010
 Yaddo, 2007
 Fulbright Scholar, Egypt, 2002-3

Books

References

External links

Living people
American male non-fiction writers
United States government people of the Iraq War
American male journalists
University of Chicago alumni
People from West Chicago, Illinois
Year of birth missing (living people)